Spanish Creek is a stream in the U.S. state of Georgia. It is a tributary to the St. Marys River.

Spanish Creek was named after "Spanish John", a local Seminole Indian.

References

Rivers of Georgia (U.S. state)
Rivers of Charlton County, Georgia